Tabernaemontana polyneura is a species of plant in the family Apocynaceae. It is endemic to Peninsular Malaysia. It is threatened by habitat loss.

References

polyneura
Endemic flora of Peninsular Malaysia
Conservation dependent plants
Taxonomy articles created by Polbot